Thomas W. Hamilton (1833–1869) was born in 1833 in Scotland, but later moved to Weymouth, Massachusetts. During the attack on the Vicksburg batteries, May 27, 1863, Hamilton, though severely wounded, returned to his post and had to be sent below.

After serving in the military, Hamilton served in the merchant marine. On April 7, 1869, he died of consumption while serving aboard a merchant vessel in the Atlantic Ocean, and was buried at sea.

See also

Siege Of Vicksburg

Namesakes 
Thomas W. Hamilton Primary School, Weymouth, Massachusetts.

Notes

References

External links
 Find A Grave Genealogy at https://www.findagrave.com
Naval History and Heritage Command: NH 115465 USS BLACK HAWK and USS CINCINNATI Engagement Report, 1863

Union Navy sailors
United States Navy Medal of Honor recipients
American Civil War recipients of the Medal of Honor
1833 births
1869 deaths